The Corridor X is one of the pan-European corridors. It runs between Salzburg in Austria and Thessaloniki in Greece. The corridor passes through Austria, Slovenia, Croatia, Serbia, North Macedonia, and Greece. It has four branches: Xa, Xb, Xc, and Xd.

The European Bank for Reconstruction and Development has given loans to support infrastructure improvements along Corridor X.

Branches
X:
Salzburg - Ljubljana - Zagreb - Belgrade - Niš - Skopje - Veles - Thessaloniki.
Branch A: Graz - Maribor - Zagreb
Branch B: Budapest - Novi Sad - Belgrade
Branch C: Niš - Sofia - Plovdiv - Edirne - Istanbul via Corridor IV
Branch D: Veles - Prilep - Bitola - Florina - Igoumenitsa (Via Egnatia)

Branch A (Corridor Xa)

Corridor Xa runs between Graz, Austria and Zagreb, Croatia through Croatia, Slovenia, and Austria.

Branch C (Corridor Xc)
Corridor Xc follows the route Niš - Sofia - Plovdiv - Edirne - Istanbul.

The road in Serbia from Niš to the Bulgarian border nearby Dimitrovgrad is recently upgraded to a motorway standard. The construction works in all sections are completed on November 9, 2019.

In Bulgaria, I-8 road connect Sofia with the Serbian border, but Kalotina motorway is planned to supersede it. Currently the transit traffic has to pass via the Sofia Ring Road, but a new bypass Northern Speed Tangent is under construction since 2015 and is expected to be completed in 2016. Trakia motorway (A1) runs from Sofia to Chirpan, where Maritsa motorway (A4), completed in October 2015, branches off to Turkey.

In Turkey, Otoyol 3 motorway runs from Edirne to Istanbul.

References

10
Roads in Austria
Roads in Slovenia
Roads in Croatia
Roads in Hungary
Roads in Serbia
Roads in Bulgaria
Roads in North Macedonia
Roads in Greece